A basidiospore is a reproductive spore produced by Basidiomycete fungi, a grouping that includes mushrooms, shelf fungi, rusts, and smuts. Basidiospores typically each contain one haploid nucleus that is the product of meiosis, and they are produced by specialized fungal cells called basidia. Typically, four basidiospores develop on appendages from each basidium, of which two are of one strain and the other two of its opposite strain. In gills under a cap of one common species, there exist millions of basidia.  Some gilled mushrooms in the order Agaricales have the ability to release billions of spores. The puffball fungus Calvatia gigantea has been calculated to produce about five trillion basidiospores. Most basidiospores are forcibly discharged, and are thus considered ballistospores. These spores serve as the main air dispersal units for the fungi. The spores are released during periods of high humidity and generally have a night-time or pre-dawn peak concentration in the atmosphere.

When basidiospores encounter a favorable substrate, they may germinate, typically by forming hyphae. These hyphae grow outward from the original spore, forming an expanding circle of mycelium. The circular shape of a fungal colony explains the formation of fairy rings, and also the circular lesions of skin-infecting fungi that cause ringworm. Some basidiospores germinate repetitively by forming small spores instead of hyphae.

General structure and shape
Basidiospores are generally characterized by an attachment peg (called a hilar appendage) on its surface. This is where the spore was attached to the basidium. The hilar appendage is quite prominent in some basidiospores, but less evident in others. An apical germ pore may also be present. Many basidiospores have an asymmetric shape due to their development on the basidium. Basidiospores are typically single-celled (without septa), and typically range from spherical to oval to oblong, to ellipsoid or cylindrical. The surface of the spore can be fairly smooth, or it can be ornamented. The color of the spore print is usually found in the spore wall, although in rare instances – like the yellow spores of Clavaria helicoides – the cytoplasm is responsible for the spore color.

References

 Tree of Life: Basidiomycota
 Basidiospores

Basidiomycota
Fungal morphology and anatomy
Mycology